El Wad is an Epipalaeolithic archaeological site in Mount Carmel, Israel. The site has two components: El Wad Cave, also known as Mugharat el-Wad or HaNahal Cave; and El Wad Terrace, located immediately outside the cave.

Together with the nearby sites of Tabun Cave, Jamal Cave, and Es-Skhul Cave, El Wad is part of the Nahal Me'arot Nature Reserve, a national park and UNESCO World Heritage Site.

Background and research history 

El Wad is one of a number of significant prehistoric archaeological sites in the caves of Wadi el-Mughara in Mount Carmel, now protected as the national nature reserve and UNESCO World Heritage Site. However in the 1920s, very little was known of the prehistory of the region, and the sites were threatened by quarrying for the construction of the Port of Haifa. In 1928, British archaeologist Charles Lambert conducted a trial excavation at El Wad on behalf of the Department of Antiquities of Mandatory Palestine to assess the area's archaeological value. Lambert's findings, especially the "sensational" discovery of a bone handle carved in the shape of an animal, "the first prehistoric work of art recorded from the Near East", established the scientific importance of the caves and prevented them being destroyed in the quarrying.

The following year, the Department of Antiquities asked Dorothy Garrod to suspend her excavations at Shuqba cave to deal with the "urgent matter" of investigating the el-Mughara caves. Garrod directed large-scale excavations at El Wad for the next six years. She quickly recognised similarities between the stone tools found at El Wad and her previous excavations at Shuqba cave, naming the newly discovered industry the Natufian, after Wadi en-Natuf near Shuqba, and tentatively linking it to the European Mesolithic, based on the fact that both used microlithic technology. Garrod began her excavations with Lambert's soundings and extended them cover most of the interior of the cave and exterior terrace.

In 1980–1981, François Valla and Ofer Bar-Yosef conducted brief excavations on the terrace to re-examine Garrod's stratigraphy. In 1988–1989, Mina Weinstein-Evron excavated a small area at the back of the cave that had not been removed by Garrod. Large-scale excavations of the terrace resumed in 1994, directed by Weinstein-Evron, Daniel Kaufman, and Reuven Yeshurun of the Zinman Institute of Archaeology, and are ongoing.

References

Further reading

External links 
 
 A Pioneer of Prehistory: Dorothy Garrod and the Caves of Mount Carmel, photo exhibition at the Pitt Rivers Museum

Archaeological sites in Israel
Natufian sites
Caves of Israel
Mount Carmel
Bone carvings